Underberg is a German bitters drink.

Underberg may also refer to:

 Underberg, KwaZulu-Natal, an administrative town in South Africa
 Theresa Underberg (born 1985), German actress and radio play talker

See also
 Unterberg (disambiguation)